Elen ferch Llywelyn (c. 1207 – 1253) was the daughter of Llywelyn the Great of Gwynedd in North Wales by Joan, Lady of Wales, the natural daughter of King John of England. 

Elen married John of Scotland, 9th Earl of Huntingdon, in about 1222.  He died aged thirty in 1237, and she was forced by King Henry III (her mother's half-brother) to marry Sir Robert de Quincy, the son of Saer de Quincy. Their daughter, Hawise, married Baldwin Wake, Lord Wake of Liddell. Hawise's granddaughter, Margaret Wake, was the mother of Joan of Kent, the first English Princess of Wales.

Elen ferch Llywelyn in fiction
Child of the Phoenix by Barbara Erskine
Here Be Dragons by Sharon Kay Penman
Falls the Shadow by Sharon Kay Penman: In Penman's version, Elen and Robert de Quincy are lovers, and she marries him immediately on John's death despite her father's opposition.

References

1200s births
1253 deaths
Year of birth uncertain
Welsh princesses
House of Aberffraw
House of Dunkeld
Huntingdon
Welsh people of English descent
13th-century Welsh nobility
13th-century Welsh women